Shi Zhongci (5 December 1933 – 13 February 2023), also known as Zhong-Ci Shi, was a Chinese mathematician. He was a computational mathematician and an academician of Chinese Academy of Sciences (CAS).

Career
Shi was born in Yin County (now Ningbo), Zhejiang on 5 December 1933. In 1955 he graduated from Ningbo Middle School. He first studied mathematics at the Department of Mathematics, Zhejiang University, under the guidance of Professor Su Buqing. Shi then was transferred to Fudan University together with Su Buqing.

After graduating from the department of mathematics of Fudan University in 1955, Shi became one of the first Chinese visiting scholars in Soviet Union, and studied computational mathematics at the Steklov Institute of Mathematics in Moscow from 1956 till 1960.

Upon returning in 1960, Shi served in the institute of computational technology of CAS. From 1965 to 1986, he was a professor in the Department of Mathematics of University of Science and Technology of China. From 1987 to 1991, he became the director of the computation center of CAS. From 1997, Shi served as the Dean of the School of Science, Shanghai Jiao Tong University. He was a research fellow of the computation center of CAS, and the director of the national key laboratory of scientific and engineering computation. Shi was a vice-dean of the College of Sciences, Zhejiang University, and a researcher at the Center of Mathematical Sciences, Zhejiang University.

On 13 February 2023, he died of an illness in Beijing, at the age of 89.

Academic positions
 Chairman of Academic Committee, the State Key Laboratory of Scientific and Engineering Computing (LSEC)
 Chairman of Academic Committee, the Institute of Computational Mathematics and Scientific/Engineering Computing (ICMSEC)
 Chief Scientist, National Key Project for Fundamental Research

References

External links
 Homepage of Zhong-Ci SHI 
 ICMSEC Interior Home Page
 LSEC Index Home Page 

1933 births
2023 deaths
20th-century Chinese mathematicians
21st-century Chinese mathematicians
Educators from Ningbo
Fudan University alumni
Mathematicians from Zhejiang
Members of the Chinese Academy of Sciences
Scientists from Ningbo
Academic staff of Shanghai Jiao Tong University
Academic staff of the University of Science and Technology of China
Zhejiang University alumni
Academic staff of Zhejiang University